Angelo Rottoli (14 December 1958 – 29 March 2020) was an Italian professional boxer. He held the European cruiserweight title in 1989 and challenged once for the WBC cruiserweight title in 1987.

Rottoli died at the age of 61 after contracting COVID-19.

References

1958 births
2020 deaths
Sportspeople from the Province of Bergamo
Italian male boxers
Cruiserweight boxers
Heavyweight boxers
European Boxing Union champions
Deaths from the COVID-19 pandemic in Lombardy